Charletonia is a genus of mites belonging to the family Erythraeidae.

References 

Trombidiformes